Paul Sather (born August 28, 1971) is an American college basketball coach, currently head men's basketball coach at the University of North Dakota.

Sather, from Princeton, Minnesota, played college basketball for Northern State in Aberdeen, South Dakota from 1990 to 1994. Following his college career, he entered coaching, first as an assistant coach at Sidney High School in Nebraska, then as a graduate assistant at Wayne State College under Greg McDermott, where he also obtained a master's degree in sports administration. In 1998, Sather returned to Northern State as an assistant coach, where he served for six years. For the 2004–05 season, Sather joined Ricardo Patton’s staff at Colorado.

In 2005, Sather was named head coach of Black Hills State University in Spearfish, South Dakota. In his five seasons at Black Hills State, he led the Yellow Jackets to a 94–62 record. His 2008–09 team went 30–5, setting a school season record for wins. In the 2008–09 season, he also won the DAC Coach of the Year.

Sather was then hired to lead the program at his alma mater, Northern State, replacing Don Meyer. His teams went 188–89 in nine seasons. During this time, Sather won back to back Northern Sun Intercollegiate Conference (NSIC) coach of the year awards and the Wolves played in the championship game of the 2018 NCAA Division II tournament, narrowly losing to Ferris State. That team finished 36-4 and set a school record for single season wins and consecutive wins with 18.

On May 30, 2019, Sather was announced as the new head coach for the North Dakota Fighting Hawks of the Summit League. He picked Jamie Stevens and Zach Horstman, who were assistants under him at Northern State, as assistant coaches. During his first season, Sather led the Fighting Hawks to the Summit League tournament championship game for the first time in school history, subsequently losing to North Dakota State.

He has two children, Sam and Becca, and a wife named Kelsie.

Head coaching record

Career stats

College

|-
| style="text-align:left;"| 1990–91
| style="text-align:left;"| Northern State
| 14 || 0 ||  || .86 ||  || 1.00 || 0.60 || 0.07 || 0.14 || 0.14 || 0.90
|-
| style="text-align:left;"| 1991–92
| style="text-align:left;"| Northern State
| 6 || 0 ||  || .33 ||  || .40 || 0.66 || 0.00 || 0.16 || 0.33 || 1.33
|-
| style="text-align:left;"| 1992–93
| style="text-align:left;"| Northern State
| 36 || 18 ||  || .58 || 1.00 || .57 || 3.88 || 0.94 || 0.97 || 0.61 || 7.16
|-
| style="text-align:left;"| 1993–94
| style="text-align:left;"| Northern State
| 34 || 34 ||  || .59 ||  || .61 || 5.58 || 1.44 || 0.97 || 0.55 || 9.97
|}

All-Conference players

NSIC
 Collin Pryor (2011 and 2013)
 Dustin Tetzlaff (2012 and 2013)
 Seth Bachand (2015)
 Tydan Storrusten (2015)
 Skye Warwick (2016)
 Darin Peterka (2016 and 2018)
 Logan Doyle (2017 and 2018)
 Ian Smith (2017-19)
 Mack Arvidson (2017)
 DJ Pollard (2018)
 Justin Decker (2019)
 Gabe King (2019)

Summit League

First Team All-Summit League
 Marlon Stewart (2020)

Second Team All-Summit League
 Filip Rebraca (2020 and 2021)

Freshman of the Year
 Tyree Ihenacho (2021)
 Paul Bruns (2022)

References

External links
 North Dakota profile

1971 births
Living people
American men's basketball coaches
American men's basketball players
Basketball coaches from Minnesota
Basketball players from Minneapolis
Black Hills State Yellow Jackets men's basketball coaches
College men's basketball head coaches in the United States
Colorado Buffaloes men's basketball coaches
High school basketball coaches in Nebraska
North Dakota Fighting Hawks men's basketball coaches
Northern State Wolves men's basketball coaches
Northern State Wolves men's basketball players
People from Princeton, Minnesota
Sportspeople from Minnesota
Wayne State College alumni
Wayne State Wildcats men's basketball coaches